Sangaikot is a small town and a subdivisional headquarters in Churachandpur district of Manipur. It has a population of 676 of which 338 are males while 338 are females as per Population Census 2011

References 

Villages in Churachandpur district